Hollywood Homicide is a 2003 American action comedy film starring Harrison Ford and Josh Hartnett, with an ensemble supporting cast including Lena Olin, Bruce Greenwood, Isaiah Washington, Lolita Davidovich, Keith David, Gladys Knight, Master P, Dwight Yoakam, Eric Idle, Robert Wagner, Kurupt, Smokey Robinson, Lou Diamond Phillips, Martin Landau, and André Benjamin. It was directed by Ron Shelton, written by Shelton and Robert Souza, and produced by Lou Pitt. The film is based on the true experiences of Souza, who was a homicide detective in the LAPD Hollywood Division and moonlighted as a real estate broker in his final ten years on the job. The film’s title sequence is done by Wayne Fitzgerald, which marks it as his final time doing a title sequence before his death in September 2019.

Plot

Sergeant Joe Gavilan is a financially strapped homicide detective with the Hollywood Division of the LAPD. He has been moonlighting as a real estate agent for seven years. His current partner is K.C. Calden, a much younger detective who teaches yoga on the side and wants to be an actor. 

The partners are investigating the murders of the four members of rap group "H2OClick", who were gunned down in a nightclub by two unidentified assailants. The detectives discover there was a witness who fled, and they work to track him down. They are distracted, failing to bond as partners, as Gavilan has to deal with a looming real estate deal that may be the key to getting out of debt, while Calden further pursues his dreams of acting by trying to be scouted by talent agents.

Meanwhile, the manager of H2OClick, Antoine Sartain, has his head of security eliminate the two hitmen, whom he had hired to kill H2OClick, and earlier a rapper named Klepto that Sartain also managed.

Gavilan and Calden believe the murders are gang-related, but when Calden happens to see the bodies of the hitmen at the morgue, they conclude that the murders were orchestrated. The detectives also notice similarities that tie the H2OClick and Klepto homicides together. Gavilan learns from an undercover officer that the songwriter for H2OClick, a man named K-Ro, has gone missing, leading Gavilan to believe he is their murder witness. They struggle to track down K-Ro until they finally learn his real name, Oliver Robideaux, the son of former Motown singer Olivia Robideaux.

Meanwhile, Internal Affairs Lieutenant Bernard "Bennie" Macko arrives at the station. Macko and Gavilan have a bad history, as Gavilan embarrassed Macko after proving him wrong on a case years ago. The animosity is compounded by the fact that Gavilan's latest love interest, a psychic named Ruby, used to date Macko. 

Macko is intent on ruining Gavilan, going so far as to try to frame him and place both detectives in interrogation. Instead, it only serves to help Gavilan and Calden strengthen their partnership. Gavilan offers to help Calden with the case of his father's death; Officer Danny Calden had been gunned down during a sting operation gone wrong, with his partner, Officer Leroy Wasley, being implicated but eventually released due to lack of evidence.

The partners track down K-Ro to his home, where Olivia professes her son's innocence and that manager Sartain was the real culprit. Sartain had been embezzling money from Klepto, H2OClick and other clients for years. Klepto and H2OClick discovered this and threatened to hire lawyers to nullify their contracts, which led Sartain to have his head of security hire the hitmen as a "lesson" to all his clients. It also turns out that Wasley is Sartain's security chief, and that Macko is also in league with him.

When the partners cannot locate Sartain and Wasley, Gavilan enlists the help of Ruby. She uses her psychic power to lead the two detectives to a clothing store. Just then, Sartain and Wasley happened to drive by, and Gavilan and Calden follow in a wild car chase. The chase ends with the four men on foot, with the two partners chasing the two culprits in different directions. 

When Gavilan struggles with Sartain, Sartain ends up falling from the top of a building to his death. Wasley has drawn a gun on Calden and loudly brags about having killed his father. Calden utilizes his acting skills to distract and incapacitate Wasley, and reveals he had a tape recorder on the whole time. Gavilan and Calden reunite as LAPD officers swarm the scene, but Macko appears and calls for the arrests of the two officers. Instead, Macko is arrested for his part in helping to cover up Sartain and Wasley's crimes.

Gavilan and Ruby are seen attending a production of A Streetcar Named Desire, in which Calden is playing a lead role. It is implied that Gavilan successfully brokered the real estate deal, and Calden is giving his all in the pursuit of his acting dream. However, both of them receive calls from police headquarters and leave in the middle of the play, now solid partners.

Cast

Production
The roles of Gavilan and Calden were previously given to John Travolta and Joseph Gordon-Levitt, respectively, before Harrison Ford and Josh Hartnett eventually signed on.

Throughout filming, Ford and Hartnett reportedly did not get along. Things apparently got so tense that the two wouldn't look each other in the eye when they're sharing scenes together with Ford calling Hartnett a "punk" while Hartnett responded by calling Ford an "old fart". They reportedly carried over the feud into the promotional tour for the film.

Reception
On the review aggregator website Rotten Tomatoes, the film holds an approval rating of 30% based on 163 reviews, and an average rating of 4.71/10. The site's critical consensus reads, "Hollywood Homicide suffers from too many subplots and not enough laughs." On Metacritic, the film has a weighted average score of 47 out of 100, based on 36 critics, indicating "mixed or average reviews". Audiences polled by CinemaScore gave the film an average grade of "B" on an A+ to F scale.

Michael O'Sullivan of The Washington Post wrote, "Hollywood Homicide is a buddy film starring two people who, even as the closing credits roll, appear to have just met" and added "every scene between them, and that's most every scene, feels like a screen test or, at best, a rehearsal." One of the few major critics to give it a positive notice was Roger Ebert, who awarded the film 3 out of 4 stars and wrote "that it's more interested in its two goofy cops than in the murder plot; their dialogue redeems otherwise standard scenes."

Box office
The film did not perform well at the box office, earning a total gross that was lower than its $75 million budget. It ranked #5 and grossed $11,112,632 in its opening weekend, coming in well below first-place holder Finding Nemo, which was in its third weekend. The film wrapped up its box office run after 12 weeks, grossing $30,940,691 in Canada and the United States and $20,201,968 in other markets for a worldwide total of $51,142,659.

Home media
The film was released on VHS and DVD October 7, 2003. The DVD edition included a director's commentary and a theatrical trailer. In 2013, Mill Creek Entertainment released the film for the first time on Blu-ray in a 2 pack set with Hudson Hawk, without any extra features.

References

External links

 
 
 
 
 Josh Hartnett interview for Hollywood Homicide

2000s American films
2000s buddy cop films
2003 comedy films
2000s English-language films
2003 films
2003 action comedy films
2000s buddy films
American action comedy films
American buddy comedy films
American buddy cop films
Columbia Pictures films
Fictional portrayals of the Los Angeles Police Department
Films directed by Ron Shelton
Films scored by Alex Wurman
Films set in Los Angeles
Films shot in Los Angeles
Revolution Studios films